The Reason Why I'm Talking S--t is an album by American jazz saxophonist Eddie Harris recorded in 1975 and released on the Atlantic label.

Reception

The Allmusic review stated "One wonders who talked Atlantic Records into issuing this offbeat LP, the jazz world's equivalent of the Elvis talking album. It's a compilation of Eddie Harris comedy monologues before sets at nightclubs in Minneapolis, Evanston, Milwaukee and Redondo Beach, with plenty of sex to go around. Actually, Eddie is pretty droll in his X-rated way, telling the audience what is really on their minds at nightclubs... Hard to find -- which is just as well".

Track listing
All compositions by Eddie Harris except as indicated
 "People Getting Ready to Go See Eddie Harris" - 8:16 
 "What I'm Thinking Before I Start Playing" - 4:49 
 "Are There Any Questions" - 10:23 
 "The Reason Why I'm Talking" - 0:11 
 "The Next Band - Music: Brother Soul, Pt. 1  2:54 
 "Ain't Shit Happening - Music: Brother Soul, Pt. 2" - 4:04 
 "Projects and High Rises - Music: Bee Bump" - 4:52 
 "Singing and Straining - Music: The Aftermath" - 6:47 
 "People Enjoying Themselves" - 4:02 
 "Eddie Atlantic" - 1:39

Personnel
Eddie Harris - tenor saxophone, vocals
Ronald Muldrow - guitar
Odell Brown - organ
Bradley Bobo - bass
Paul Humphrey - drums
Calvin Barnes - percussion

References 

Eddie Harris live albums
1975 live albums
Atlantic Records live albums